was a Japanese Major General during World War II.

Biography 

Takeo Manjome was a major-general of the Imperial Japanese Army who was one of the generals in command of the occupation of the Philippines. He commanded the 78th Infantry Brigade of the 102nd IJA Division, and was one of the occupiers of the Visayan Islands. He wanted to build defenses around the coastal plains of Cebu, which was an island that the United States' marines were landing on. But after a while of fighting, he decided that resistance would be futile and that he should call things quits. He began a slow retreat, hoping to inflict some casualties on the Americans as they fell back to friendly territory. But James M. Cushing's 8,500 Cebu guerrillas, who had remained resolute to fight ever since 1941, ambushed the retreating forces and entrapped them in a small corridor. Manjome was killed by submachine gun fire as he tried to fight, while the rest of his forces were either killed or fought until the end of the war.

References 

Japanese generals
Imperial Japanese Army generals of World War II
1945 deaths
1900 births
Japanese military personnel killed in World War II
Deaths by firearm in the Philippines